Fortunata may refer to:

Arts and entertainment
Fortunata (film), 2017
 Fortunata, a 1911 novel by Marjorie Patterson

People
Fortunata (name)
 Saint Fortunata, a 4th-century Christian martyr

Fictional characters
 Fortunata, the wife of Trimalchio in Petronius' Satyricon
 Fortunata, character in the novel Fortunata y Jacinta by Benito Pérez Galdós
 Fortunata, character in the novel The Heretic's Apprentice

See also

Fortunato (disambiguation)